Lukochuri (Bengali: লুকোচুরি) is a Bengali romantic comedy film directed by Kamal Majumdar and produced in the banner of Kishore Kumar Films. The film stars Kishore Kumar, Mala Sinha and Anita Guha in lead roles. The film was released on  27 June 1958.

Plot
Kumar leaves home for a job in Bombay and stays with his twin brother Sankar. Shankar wants to be a musician and is in love with an artist, Geeta. In the office, he meets Reeta (Geeta's younger sister) with whom his friendship soon develops into love.

Cast
Kishore Kumar - Shankar / Kumar 'Buddhu' (Double Role)
Mala Sinha - Reeta
Anita Guha - Geeta
Anoop Kumar
Keshto Mukherjee
Nripati Chattopadhyay
Ajit Chatterjee
Moni Chatterjee
Bipin Gupta
Rajlaksmi Devi
Nabyendu Ghosh

Soundtrack
All songs are lyrics by Gauriprasanna Mazumder & music by Hemant Kumar.

References

External links
www.gomolo.in
 

1958 films
Bengali-language Indian films
Indian black-and-white films
1958 romantic comedy films
Indian romantic comedy films
Films scored by Hemant Kumar
1950s Bengali-language films